The Sirhowy Valley is an industrialised valley in the eastern part of the Valleys region of Wales. It is named from the Sirhowy River which runs through it. Its upper reaches are occupied by the town of Tredegar within the unitary area of Blaenau Gwent. The valley initially heads south-southeast between the ridges of Cefn Manmoel to the east and Mynydd Bedwellte to the west before turning to a more southerly direction. Its central section is one of the least populated of the Welsh coalfield valleys. The valley enters the unitary area of Caerphilly which contains the towns of Blackwood and Pontllanfraith. It then turns east and joins the valley of the Ebbw River, Ebbw Vale at Crosskeys.

History 
The valley's industrial history began with ironworks before evolving to meet the demand for coal and the expansion of coal mining. This process was led by companies such as the Tredegar Iron and Coal Company. Coal mines used to be located throughout the valley, including: Wyllie; Nine Mile Point and Oakdale.  The Sirhowy passes the old Gelligroes Mill near Blackwood along its path.

Prior to the Beeching Axe, the valley was served by the Sirhowy Railway. Stations could be found at many points including Nantybwch, Argoed, Blackwood, Pontllanfraith and Ynysddu.

References

External links
The Sirhowy Valley Website
www.geograph.co.uk : photos of the Sirhowy Valley and surrounding area

Valleys of Blaenau Gwent
Caerphilly
Valleys of Caerphilly County Borough